Josip Klasancije Schlosser pl. Klekovski (1801–1882) was a Croatian physician, alpinist and botanist.

Together with Ljudevit Farkaš Vukotinović, he was an author of Flora croatica (1869), the main work for the knowledge of plants in Croatia. He was the most prominent 19th century botanist and explorer of Risnjak mountain, and wrote numerous publications about Risnjak's flora.

References

Physicians from the Kingdom of Dalmatia
Croatian biologists
Croatian botanists
1801 births
1882 deaths
Members of the Croatian Academy of Sciences and Arts